Rohan Burke (born 24 July 1961) is a former Australian rules footballer who played with Carlton in the Victorian Football League (VFL). He is the son of Gerald Burke who played for Carlton in the 1950s.

Notes

External links 

Rohan Burke's profile at Blueseum

1961 births
Carlton Football Club players
Australian rules footballers from Victoria (Australia)
Reservoir Lakeside Football Club players
Living people